Vladimiru may refer to:

Vladimiru River
Vladimir, Gorj